Eye color is a polygenic phenotypic character determined by two factors: the pigmentation of the eye's iris and the frequency-dependence of the scattering of light by the turbid medium in the stroma of the iris.

In humans, the pigmentation of the iris varies from light brown to black, depending on the concentration of melanin in the iris pigment epithelium (located on the back of the iris), the melanin content within the iris stroma (located at the front of the iris), and the cellular density of the stroma. The appearance of blue, green, and hazel eyes results from the Tyndall scattering of light in the stroma, a phenomenon similar to Rayleigh scattering which accounts for the blue sky. Neither blue nor green pigments are present in the human iris or vitreous humour. This is an example of structural color, which depends on the lighting conditions, especially for lighter-colored eyes.

The brightly colored eyes of many bird species result from the presence of other pigments, such as pteridines, purines, and carotenoids. Humans and other animals have many phenotypic variations in eye color.

The genetics and inheritance of eye color in humans is complicated. , as many as 16 genes have been associated with eye color inheritance. Some of the eye-color genes include OCA2 and HERC2. The earlier belief that blue eye color is a simple recessive trait has been shown to be incorrect. The genetics of eye color are so complex that almost any parent-child combination of eye colors can occur. However, OCA2 gene polymorphism, close to proximal 5' regulatory region, explains most human eye-color variation.

Genetic determination
Eye color is an inherited trait determined by multiple genes. These genes are sought by studying small changes in the genes themselves and in neighboring genes, called single-nucleotide polymorphisms or SNPs. The total number of genes that contribute to eye color is unknown, but there are a few likely candidates. A study in Rotterdam (2009) found that it was possible to predict eye color with more than 90% accuracy for brown and blue using just six SNPs. 

People of European descent show the greatest variety in eye color of any population worldwide. Recent advances in ancient DNA technology have revealed some of the history of eye color in Europe. Through the analysis of ancient DNA, a 2020 study published in Experimental Dermatology suggested that the common gene for blue eye color likely originated in the Near East and arrived in Europe around 42,000 years ago, after the exodus out of Africa.

There is evidence that as many as 16 different genes could be responsible for eye color in humans; however, the main two genes associated with eye color variation are OCA2 and HERC2, and both are localized in Chromosome 15.

The gene OCA2, when in a variant form, causes the pink eye color and hypopigmentation common in human albinism. (The name of the gene is derived from the disorder it causes, oculocutaneous albinism type II.) Different SNPs within OCA2 are strongly associated with blue and green eyes as well as variations in freckling, mole counts, hair and skin tone. The polymorphisms may be in an OCA2 regulatory sequence, where they may influence the expression of the gene product, which in turn affects pigmentation. A specific mutation within the HERC2 gene, a gene that regulates OCA2 expression, is partly responsible for blue eyes. Other genes implicated in eye color variation are SLC24A4 and TYR. A 2010 study of eye color variation in hue and saturation values using high-resolution digital full-eye photographs found three new loci for a total of ten genes, allowing the explanation of about 50% of eye colour variation.
 

Blue eyes with a brown spot, green eyes, and gray eyes are caused by an entirely different part of the genome.

Changes in eye color

Most newborn babies who have European ancestry have light-colored eyes. As the child develops, melanocytes (cells found within the iris of human eyes, as well as skin and hair follicles) slowly begin to produce melanin. Because melanocyte cells continually produce pigment, in theory eye color can be changed. Adult eye color is usually established between 3 and 6 months of age, though this can be later. Observing the iris of an infant from the side using only transmitted light with no reflection from the back of the iris, it is possible to detect the presence or absence of low levels of melanin. An iris that appears blue under this method of observation is more likely to remain blue as the infant ages. An iris that appears golden contains some melanin even at this early age and is likely to turn from blue to green or brown as the infant ages.

Changes (lightening or darkening) of eye color during early childhood, puberty, pregnancy, and sometimes after serious trauma (like heterochromia) suggest that eyes sometimes change color under certain circumstances, due to chemical reactions or hormonal changes within the body.

Studies on Caucasian twins, both fraternal and identical, have shown that eye color over time can be subject to change, and major demelanization of the iris may also be genetically determined. Most eye color changes have been observed or reported in the Caucasian population with hazel and amber eyes. Under the same environmental conditions, there may be disagreement over the color of an object between two different people; the factor that causes this discrepancy is the presence of melanin in the iris, which is the main factor in determining eye color. The higher the amount of melanin in the iris and the denser the texture of the melanin, the darker the color of a person's eyes; the same melanin concentration also depends on many factors such as hereditary and environmental ones.

The human eye consists of two types of light and color receptors in the retina. Cylindrical cells are the photoreceptors of the eye that have a black and white vision and, depending on the amount of light received from the environment, determine the amount of darkness and brightness of objects. The number of cylindrical cells is more than the number of color receptors and reaches about 120 million; cone cells, which are smaller in number than light receptors, have color vision and are divided into three distinct categories, each of which recognizes one of the colors blue, red, and green, allowing the individual to distinguish colors.

Eye color range

Brown

Almost all mammals have brown or darkly-pigmented irises. In humans, brown is by far the most common eye color, with approximately 79% of people in the world having it.
Brown eyes result from a relatively high concentration of melanin in the stroma of the iris, which causes light of both shorter and longer wavelengths to be absorbed.

Dark brown eyes are dominant in humans. In many parts of the world, it is nearly the only iris color present. Brown eyes are common in Europe, East Asia, Southeast Asia, Central Asia, South Asia, West Asia, Oceania, Africa and the Americas. 
Light or medium-pigmented brown eyes can also be commonly found in South Europe, among the Americas, and parts of Central Asia, West Asia and South Asia.

Amber

Amber eyes are a solid color with a strong yellowish/golden and russet/coppery tint, which may be due to the yellow pigment called lipochrome  (also found in green eyes). Amber eyes should not be confused with hazel eyes. Although hazel eyes may contain specks of amber or gold, they usually tend to have many other colors, including green, brown and orange. Also, hazel eyes may appear to shift in color and consist of flecks and ripples, while amber eyes are of a solid gold hue. Even though amber is similar to gold, some people have russet or copper colored amber eyes that are mistaken for hazel, though hazel tends to be duller and contains green with red/gold flecks, as mentioned above. Amber eyes may also contain amounts of very light gold-ish gray.

The eyes of some pigeons contain yellow fluorescing pigments known as pteridines. The bright yellow eyes of the great horned owl are thought to be due to the presence of the pteridine pigment xanthopterin within certain chromatophores (called xanthophores) located in the iris stroma. In humans, yellowish specks or patches are thought to be due to the pigment lipofuscin, also known as lipochrome. Many animals such as canines, domestic cats, owls, eagles, pigeons and fish have amber eyes, whereas in humans this color occurs less frequently. Amber is the third-rarest natural eye color after green and gray, in 5% of the world's population. People with that eye color are found in Spain, Balkan region, Hungary, Italy, Southern Cone, Colombia, Pakistan and Middle East.

Hazel

Hazel eyes are due to a combination of Rayleigh scattering and a moderate amount of melanin in the iris' anterior border layer. Hazel eyes often appear to shift in color from a brown to a green. Although hazel mostly consists of brown and green, the dominant color in the eye can either be brown/gold or green. This is why hazel eyes can be mistaken as amber and vice versa. The combination can sometimes produce a multicolored iris, i.e., an eye that is light brown/amber near the pupil and charcoal or dark green on the outer part of the iris (or vice versa) when observed in sunlight.

Definitions of the eye color hazel vary: it is sometimes considered to be synonymous with light brown or gold, as in the color of a hazelnut shell.

Around 18% of the US population and 5% of the world population have hazel eyes. Hazel eyes are more common in Spaniards, North Africa, the Middle East, and Brazil.

Green

Green eyes probably result from the interaction of multiple variants within the OCA2 and other genes. They were present in south Siberia during the Bronze Age.

Green eyes are most common in Northern, Western and Central Europe. In Scotland, 29% of people have green eyes. Around 8–10% of men and 18–21% of women in Iceland and 6% of men and 17% of women in the Netherlands, have green eyes. Among European Americans, green eyes are most common among those of recent Celtic and Germanic ancestry with about 16%.

The green color is caused by the combination of: 1) an amber or light brown pigmentation in the stroma of the iris (which has a low or moderate concentration of melanin) with: 2) a blue shade created by the Rayleigh scattering of reflected light. Green eyes contain the yellowish pigment lipochrome.

Blue

There is no blue pigmentation either in the iris or in the vitreous body. Dissection reveals that the iris pigment epithelium is brownish black due to the presence of melanin. Unlike brown eyes, blue eyes have low concentrations of melanin in the stroma of the iris, which lies in front of the dark epithelium. Longer wavelengths of light tend to be absorbed by the dark underlying epithelium, while shorter wavelengths are reflected and undergo Rayleigh scattering in the turbid medium of the stroma. This is the same scattering that accounts for the blue appearance of the sky. The result is a "Tyndall blue" structural color that varies with external lighting conditions.

The inheritance pattern followed by blue eyes was previously assumed to be a mendelian recessive trait, however, eye color inheritance is now recognized as a polygenic trait, meaning that it is controlled by the interactions of several genes. In 2008, new research tracked down one genetic mutation that leads to blue eyes. "Originally, we all had brown eyes" said Eiberg. Eiberg and colleagues suggested in a study published in Human Genetics that a mutation in the 86th intron of the HERC2 gene, which is hypothesized to interact with the OCA2 gene promoter, reduced expression of OCA2 with subsequent reduction in melanin production. The authors suggest that the mutation may have arisen in the northwestern part of the Black Sea region, and add that it is "difficult to calculate the age of the mutation."

Blue eyes are predominant in northern and eastern Europe, particularly around the Baltic Sea. Blue eyes are also found in southern Europe, Central Asia, South Asia, North Africa and West Asia.

The same DNA sequence in the region of the OCA2 gene among blue-eyed people suggests they may have a single common ancestor.

Approximately 8% to 10% of the global population have blue eyes. A 2002 study found that the prevalence of blue eye color among the white population in the United States to be 33.8% for those born from 1936 through 1951, compared with 57.4% for those born from 1899 through 1905. , one out of every six Americans, or 16.6% of the total US population, has blue eyes, including 22.3% of whites. The incidence of blue eyes continues to decline among American children. 56% of Slovenes have blue/green eyes.

Gray

Like blue eyes, gray eyes have a dark epithelium at the back of the iris and a relatively clear stroma at the front. One possible explanation for the difference in the appearance of gray and blue eyes is that gray eyes have larger deposits of collagen in the stroma, so that the light that is reflected from the epithelium undergoes Mie scattering (which is not strongly frequency-dependent) rather than Rayleigh scattering (in which shorter wavelengths of light are scattered more). This would be analogous to the change in the color of the sky, from the blue given by the Rayleigh scattering of sunlight by small gas molecules when the sky is clear, to the gray caused by Mie scattering of large water droplets when the sky is cloudy. Alternatively, it has been suggested that gray and blue eyes might differ in the concentration of melanin at the front of the stroma.

Gray eyes can also be found among the Algerian Shawia people of the Aurès Mountains in Northwest Africa, in the Middle East/West Asia, Central Asia, and South Asia. The Greek goddess Athene appears with gray eyes (γλαυκῶπις). Under magnification, gray eyes exhibit small amounts of yellow and brown color in the iris.

Gray is the second-rarest natural eye color after green, with 3% of the world's population having it.

Special cases

Red and violet

The eyes of people with severe forms of albinism may appear red under certain lighting conditions owing to the extremely low quantities of melanin, allowing the blood vessels to show through. In addition, flash photography can sometimes cause a "red-eye effect", in which the very bright light from a flash reflects off the retina, which is abundantly vascular, causing the pupil to appear red in the photograph. 

Although the deep blue eyes of some people such as Elizabeth Taylor can appear purple or violet at certain times, "true" violet-colored eyes occur only due to albinism. Eyes that appear red or violet under certain conditions due to albinism are less than 1 percent of the world's population.

Two different colors 

As a result of heterochromia iridum, it is also possible to have two different eye colors. This occurs in humans and certain breeds of domesticated animals and affects less than 1 percent of the world's population.

Spectrum of eye color

Medical implications
The most important role of melanin in the iris is to protect the eyes from the sun's harmful rays. People with lighter eye colors, such as blue or green, have lessened protection from the sun, and so need greater protection from the sun's rays than those with darker eye colors.

Those with lighter iris color have been found to have a higher prevalence of age-related macular degeneration (ARMD) than those with darker iris color; lighter eye color is also associated with an increased risk of ARMD progression. A gray iris may indicate the presence of a uveitis, and an increased risk of uveal melanoma has been found in those with blue, green or gray eyes. However, a study in 2000 suggests that people with dark brown eyes are at increased risk of developing cataracts and therefore should protect their eyes from direct exposure to sunlight.

Wilson's disease

Wilson's disease involves a mutation of the gene coding for the enzyme ATPase 7B, which prevents copper within the liver from entering the Golgi apparatus in cells. Instead, the copper accumulates in the liver and in other tissues, including the iris of the eye. This results in the formation of Kayser–Fleischer rings, which are dark rings that encircle the periphery of the iris.

Coloration of the sclera
Eye color outside of the iris may also be symptomatic of disease. Yellowing of the sclera (the "whites of the eyes") is associated with jaundice, and may be symptomatic of liver diseases such as cirrhosis or hepatitis. A blue coloration of the sclera may also be symptomatic of disease.

Aniridia

Aniridia is a congenital condition characterized by an extremely underdeveloped iris, which appears absent on superficial examination.

Ocular albinism and eye color
Normally, there is a thick layer of melanin on the back of the iris. Even people with the lightest blue eyes, with no melanin on the front of the iris at all, have dark brown coloration on the back of it, to prevent light from scattering around inside the eye. In those with milder forms of albinism, the color of the iris is typically blue but can vary from blue to brown. In severe forms of albinism, there is no pigment on the back of the iris, and light from inside the eye can pass through the iris to the front. In these cases, the only color seen is the red from the hemoglobin of the blood in the capillaries of the iris. Such albinos have pink eyes, as do albino rabbits, mice, or any other animal with a total lack of melanin. Transillumination defects can almost always be observed during an eye examination due to lack of iridial pigmentation. The ocular albino also lacks normal amounts of melanin in the retina as well, which allows more light than normal to reflect off the retina and out of the eye. Because of this, the pupillary reflex is much more pronounced in albino individuals, and this can emphasize the red eye effect in photographs.

Heterochromia

Heterochromia (heterochromia iridum or heterochromia iridis) is an eye condition in which one iris is a different color from the other (complete heterochromia), or where a part of one iris is a different color from the remainder (partial heterochromia or sectoral heterochromia). It is a result of the relative excess or lack of pigment within an iris or part of an iris, which may be inherited or acquired by disease or injury. This uncommon condition usually results due to uneven melanin content. A number of causes are responsible, including genetic, such as chimerism, Horner's syndrome and Waardenburg syndrome.

A chimera can have two different colored eyes just like any two siblings can—because each cell has different eye color genes. A mosaic can have two different colored eyes if the DNA difference happens to be in an eye-color gene.

There are many other possible reasons for having two different-colored eyes. For example, the film actor Lee Van Cleef was born with one blue eye and one green eye, a trait that reportedly was common in his family, suggesting that it was a genetic trait. This anomaly, which film producers thought would be disturbing to film audiences, was "corrected" by having Van Cleef wear brown contact lenses. David Bowie, on the other hand, had the appearance of different eye colors due to an injury that caused one pupil to be permanently dilated.

Another hypothesis about heterochromia is that it can result from a viral infection in utero affecting the development of one eye, possibly through some sort of genetic mutation. Occasionally, heterochromia can be a sign of a serious medical condition.

A common cause in females with heterochromia is X-inactivation, which can result in a number of heterochromatic traits, such as calico cats. Trauma and certain medications, such as some prostaglandin analogues, can also cause increased pigmentation in one eye. On occasion, a difference in eye color is caused by blood staining the iris after injury.

Impact on vision 
Although people with lighter eye color are generally more sensitive to light because they have less pigment in the iris to protect them from sunlight, there is little to no evidence that eye color has a direct impact on vision qualities such as visual acuity. However, there is a study that found that dark-eyed people perform better at "reactive-type tasks", which suggests they may have better reaction times. People with light-colored eyes, however, performed better at so-called "self-paced tasks", which include activities like hitting a golf ball or throwing baseballs. In another study, people with darker eyes performed better at hitting racquetballs. There are also other studies that challenge these findings. According to scientists, more study is needed to verify these results.

Classification of color
Iris color can provide a large amount of information about a person, and a classification of colors may be useful in documenting pathological changes or determining how a person may respond to ocular pharmaceuticals. Classification systems have ranged from a basic light or dark description to detailed gradings employing photographic standards for comparison. Others have attempted to set objective standards of color comparison.

The Martin–Schultz scale, developed from the Martin scale, is one standard color scale used in physical anthropology to establish the eye color of an individual. It was created by the anthropologists Rudolf Martin and Bruno K Schultz in the first half of the 20th century. The scale consists of 20 colors ranging from light blue to dark brown-black, corresponding to natural eye colors caused by the amount of melanin in the iris:

Normal eye colors range from the darkest shades of brown to the lightest tints of blue. To meet the need for standardized classification, at once simple yet detailed enough for research purposes, Seddon et al. developed a graded system based on the predominant iris color and the amount of brown or yellow pigment present. There are three pigment colors that determine, depending on their proportion, the outward appearance of the iris, along with structural color. Green irises, for example, have some yellow and the blue structural color. Brown irises contain more or less melanin. Some eyes have a dark ring around the iris, called a limbal ring.

Eye color in non-human animals is regulated differently. For example, instead of blue as in humans, autosomal recessive eye color in the skink species Corucia zebrata is black, and the autosomal dominant color is yellow-green.

As the perception of color depends on viewing conditions (e.g., the amount and kind of illumination, as well as the hue of the surrounding environment), so does the perception of eye color.

See also
 Hair color
 Iridology
 Human skin color
 Xanthophore

References

External links

 genetics.thetech.org
 Eye Color and Human Diseases

 
Eye
Facial features
Color